William Galiwango (born 26 February 1961) is a Ugandan boxer. He competed in the men's light welterweight event at the 1984 Summer Olympics. At the 1984 Summer Olympics, he defeated Anthony Rose of Jamaica, before losing to Charles Nwokolo Nigeria.

References

1961 births
Living people
Ugandan male boxers
Olympic boxers of Uganda
Boxers at the 1984 Summer Olympics
Sportspeople from Kampala
Light-welterweight boxers